

Hamilton Inlet is a fjord-like inlet of Groswater Bay on the Labrador coast of the Canadian province of Newfoundland and Labrador. Lake Melville is generally considered a part of Hamilton Inlet and extends west of the deep, narrow passage at the community of Rigolet.

Names
It was given its present name in honour of Charles Hamilton, commodore-governor of Newfoundland in the early 1800s and former namesake of the inlet's affluent, the Hamilton River (now the Churchill). Inclusive of Groswater Bay, it has also been known as Ivucktoke (Inuttitut: Aivitok); Eskimo or Esquimaux Bay ("Bay of the Eskimos"); and St Louis Bay.

History
In 1586, it was the scene of an Inuit attack on the expedition of John Davis which killed two and wounded others.

References

Citations

Bibliography
 .

External links
 A map of Labrador showing Hamilton Inlet as excluding L. Melville
 "River Flow and Winter Hydrographic Structure of the Hamilton Inlet-Lake Melville Estuary of Labrador", which treats Hamilton Inlet as synonymous with Groswater Bay and exclusive of Lake Melville

Estuaries of Canada
Bays of Newfoundland and Labrador
Labrador